Bhoja (fl. 1000–1050) was a philosopher king and polymath of the Paramara Dynasty.

Bhoja or Bhoj may also refer to:

People

 Gurjara-Pratihara kings
 Mihira Bhoja or Bhoja I (836–885), emperor of the Gurjara-Pratihara Dynasty
 Bhoja II (Gurjara-Pratihara dynasty) (910–913), king of Gurjara-Pratihara Dynasty

 Shilahara kings
 Bhoja I, 11th century Shilahara king of southern Maharashtra
 Bhoja II (Shilahara dynasty) (1175–1212), last ruler of the Shilahara dynasty

 Others
 Bhoja II (Paramara dynasty), 13th century CE; a descendant of the Paramara king Bhoja
 Bhoja Varman, 13th century Chandela king
 Bhoj Raj (fl. 1516–1526), eldest son of Rana Sanga, ruler of Mewar
 Bhoja Bhagat (1785–1850), Hindu saint, social reformer, and poet
Bhoja of Kannauj, 9th century Kannauj king

Other uses
 Bhoja Air, a Pakistani airline
 Bhojas of Goa, a dynasty that ruled Goa and parts of Konkan and Karnataka from the 3rd to 6th century
 Bhoj, India, a village in Belgaum District, Karnataka
 Bhoj Wetland, two lakes in Bhopal, Madhya Pradesh, India
 Kunti-Bhoja (Kuntibhoja), foster-father of Kunti, the mother of the Pandavas in Hindu mythology